Robert John "Rob" Hudson (born 9 December 1955, in Melbourne, Victoria) is a former Australian politician He holds honours degrees in social work and law, and was a member of the Victorian Legislative Assembly for the Labor Party. He was elected to the Bentleigh electorate in the 2002 state election defeating incumbent Inga Peulich, and was re-elected in 2006. Hudson is a supporter of the Hawthorn Football Club.

Career 
Prior to his election as the member for Bentleigh, he worked at the Brotherhood of St Laurence, and was the Director of the Victorian Council of Social Service. In 1993, he became Senior Advisor to the Deputy Prime Minister of Australia. He held this position for three years before becoming the CEO of WorkPlacement. From 1999, he held the position of Social Policy Director to the Premier of Victoria. After being elected to parliament in 2002, he became the Chair of the Victorian Parliamentary Law Reform Committee from 2002–2006, the Parliamentary Secretary for Infrastructure from 2006–2007, the Parliamentary Secretary for Public Transport and the Arts from 2007–2009, and Parliamentary Secretary to the Premier and for the Arts in 2010.  He was a supporter of abortion law reform in 2008 and voted for the bill.

Hudson was defeated in the 2010 Victorian state election by Elizabeth Miller of the Liberal Party, losing by just 441 votes. His defeat allowed the Liberal-National Party Coalition to form government by one seat.

References

 Rob Hudson M.P.- Member for Bentleigh http://www.robhudson.com.au/
 http://www.parliament.vic.gov.au/re-member/bioregfull.cfm?mid=1571
 http://www.aharkness.org/01_cms/details.asp?k_id=36
 http://tex.parliament.vic.gov.au/bin/texhtmlt?form=VicHansard.dumpall&db=hansard91&dodraft=0&startpage=82&origquery=&query=(+members+contains+'HUDSON'+)&speech=21864&mem_selected=HUDSON&activity=Governor's+Speech&title=Address-in-Reply&date1=27&date2=February&date3=2003

1955 births
Living people
Australian Labor Party members of the Parliament of Victoria
Politicians from Melbourne
Members of the Victorian Legislative Assembly
21st-century Australian politicians